Tetsuya Fujita may refer to:

 Ted Fujita (1920–1998), Japanese-American severe storms researcher
 Tetsuya Fujita (actor) (born 1978), Japanese actor